Hellaby is a civil parish in the Metropolitan Borough of Rotherham, South Yorkshire, England.  The parish contains two listed buildings that are recorded in the National Heritage List for England.  Of these, one is listed at Grade II*, the middle of the three grades, and the other is at Grade II, the lowest grade.  The listed buildings consist of a large house converted into a hotel, and its former stable.


Key

Buildings

References

Citations

Sources

 

Lists of listed buildings in South Yorkshire
Buildings and structures in the Metropolitan Borough of Rotherham